Robert Albert Thomas (2 August 1919 – March 1990) was an English professional footballer who played as an inside forward in the Football League for Plymouth Argyle, Fulham and Crystal Palace.

Career 
Thomas played in the Football League for Plymouth Argyle, Fulham and Crystal Palace and scored 103 goals in 304 appearances. He also played for Golders Green, Brentford and Kettering Town and appeared as a guest player for West Ham United during the Second World War.

Personal life 
Thomas' brother, Dave, played in the Football League for several clubs as a centre forward and the two played alongside each other for Plymouth Argyle during the 1946–47 season.

Honours 
Golders Green

 Middlesex Senior Cup: 1938–39

Career statistics

References

External links

Bob Thomas at holmesdale.net

1919 births
Footballers from Stepney
English footballers
Association football forwards
Hendon F.C. players
Brentford F.C. players
Plymouth Argyle F.C. players
Fulham F.C. players
Crystal Palace F.C. players
Kettering Town F.C. players
West Ham United F.C. wartime guest players
English Football League players
1990 deaths
Romford F.C. players
Hayes F.C. players
Ebbsfleet United F.C. players
F.C. Clacton players